Septimus Orion is a recording project initiated with the release of its first studio album CAGED in August 2008. The album includes an audio version of Clifford Meth's short story Queers. This short story was originally published in god's 15 minutes by Aardwolf Publishing. 

Personnel

The album was recorded by musicians who were otherwise engaged in other recording endeavors, and thus Septimus Orion was not formed as a band, but as a collaborative creation. Former Celtic Frost drummer Reed St. Mark worked on this project while also working on the Triptykon project with former Celtic Frost bandmate Tom Gabriel Fischer. Veteran songwriter and musician Mark Radice contributed to the recording while continuing to compose and record for Public Television. For that work, Radice was nominated for an Emmy Award in 2008. Former front man and vocalist for Lodi hardcore punk band Rosemary's Babies, known as JR (Vincent C Paladino), joined Septimus Orion with a rerecorded version of his song Sanctioned Violence.

Tom Monda, who would later become a founding member of Thank You Scientist, was the principle guitarist on the album.

Artwork

The album CAGED features cover art by the late "X-Men" comic artist Dave Cockrum. Album also includes Space-themed music, using sounds from space recorded by NASA and The University of Iowa.

Related Works

In November 2017, Septimus Orion released a single titled "Goodnight Sweet Boy" that featured Robby Bloodshed.

Contributing Group Members

 Clifford Meth
 Reed St. Mark
 Dave Cockrum
 Mark Radice
 JR (Vincent C Paladino)
 Kate Oberjat
 Tom Monda
 Chris Cali
 Christian Krank

Discography
2008 CAGED (Consurgo Records)

Track list details

1. Bludgeoned - 7:01
2. Bellatrix - 3:27
3. Rush Rush-3:34
4. Rush Rush (trip mix) - 5:53
5. Sanctioned Violence - 2:29
6. "Queers" by Clifford Meth - 37:25

References

External links
 Septimus Orion official website
 Reed St. Mark official website
 Mark Radice Discography
 Clifford Meth at the Comic Book DB
 space audio at UIOWA

Experimental musical groups